Mount Porte Crayon is a mountain in the Roaring Plains Wilderness of the Monongahela National Forest in the northeastern corner of Randolph County, West Virginia, USA. The mountain is named for 19th century writer and illustrator David Hunter Strother (1816–88), known as "Porte Crayon" (French, porte-crayon: "pencil/crayon holder"), who produced a wide array of early West Virginia landscapes in his work.

Geography
Mount Porte Crayon is the sixth highest point in the state of West Virginia and the northernmost of the top ten state highpoints. It is also the highest point on the Roaring Plains, a natural extension of the Dolly Sods Wilderness.

It is also the highest point on the Eastern Continental Divide in Maryland, Pennsylvania, and West Virginia. The relatively flat plateau on which it sits is the highest, largest plateau in eastern North America with 5.5 square miles lying at or above the 4,500 ft. elevation contour.

The summit area is set aside as an  prescribed management area, and is a Research Natural Area, for a native mountaintop red spruce forest that is home to endangered northern flying squirrel and endangered Cheat Mountain salamander. Mount Porte Crayon is the remote headwaters to three drainages and is the highest point on the Eastern Continental Divide in West Virginia, Maryland, and Pennsylvania.

History

Naming
A group of admirers formed the "Porte Crayon Memorial Society" in 1940. Upon learning of the  promontory (as it was then measured) in the heart of the writer-illustrator's beloved highland terrain, they successfully lobbied to have it named in his honor. On July 5, 1940, a dedication ceremony was held at the top of the Mountain following a three-hour trek to the site. It included a eulogy, a singing of the national anthem, and the raising of the Star-Spangled Banner atop a spruce flagpole.

Nature Conservancy preserve
The Mount Porte Crayon Preserve is wrapped around the southern shoulder of its namesake Mountain and borders Monongahela National Forest's Roaring Plains Wilderness for more than three-fourths of a mile. This is part of an ongoing, long-term program by the Nature Conservancy to protect  at Mount Porte Crayon.

Climate
Mount Porte Crayon is notorious for its inclement weather, rapidly changing conditions, and strong winds. The prevailing westerly winds are so strong, especially in winter, that they deform exposed red spruce trees, causing the trees to be one-sided with branches growing mostly on the east side. Also, the summit is frequently in the clouds. Fog can quickly become so dense as to completely disorient hikers.

Temperatures on the summit are relatively cold, with monthly values averaging below freezing 4 months of the year. Such cold is usually accompanied by strong winds, making for dangerously low wind chills.

Summer afternoons usually reach the upper 60s °F (20 °C) with mornings in the low to mid 50s °F (11.5 °C). Thunderstorms are frequent and can be violent with dangerous cloud-to-ground lightning.

Precipitation is plentiful, with the annual total estimated to be about  distributed well across all months. Snowfall is also plentiful, averaging about  a season. Unusually snowy winters can produce  or more. Snow usually begins falling in early October, ending by early May. Occasional periods of rainfall and temperatures in the 50s °F are common even in the coldest months due to the relatively southerly location of the summit (39 degrees N) allowing for mild above freezing air intrusions from the Gulf of Mexico. These warm rainy periods typically hold down snow accumulations on the ground and result in alternating periods of snow cover and bare ground.

Recreation

Hiking
Mount Porte Crayon remains one of West Virginia's most inaccessible peaks, since it is far from the nearest trail, let alone a public road. A walk to the summit using the U.S. Forest Service's Flat Rock Run Trail or Roaring Plains Trail totals more than five miles and is a  gain endeavor. This involves a three-mile bushwhack through dense spruce thicket (including half a mile of some very thick spruce and rhododendron). Summiting Mount Porte Crayon is for experienced hikers only and its difficulty should not be underestimated. Views are afforded from a crag, known as Thunderstruck Rock, about a quarter mile from the summit.

A visit to the Nature Conservancy's preserve, which is open to the public, involves a three-mile round-trip hike from the junction of the aforementioned trails along the Mount Porte Crayon Grade — a former railroad swath that now accommodates an unmarked and unmaintained trail onto the preserve.

Ski resort plans
Mount Porte Crayon has been involved in controversy due to plans by Bill Bright, developer of the Winterplace and Glade Springs resorts, who wants to bring a ski resort to the area.  The proposed ski area is rumored to be named "Almost Heaven Mountain Resort" and will have the largest vertical drop south of New York.

References

External links
USFS Map of Mount Porte Crayon & environs
USFS real time images of Mount Porte Crayon & environs

Mountains of Randolph County, West Virginia
Porte Crayon
Allegheny Mountains
Monongahela National Forest
Landforms of Pendleton County, West Virginia
Nature Conservancy preserves
Protected areas of Pendleton County, West Virginia
Protected areas of Randolph County, West Virginia
Nature reserves in West Virginia
IUCN Category V